Chopper I is a vertically scrolling shooter arcade video game developed by SNK and published in 1988. In Japan it was released as {{nihongo foot|The Legend of Air Cavalry|Kanji: 航空騎兵物語|Hepburn: Koukuu Kihei Monogatari}}.

The objective of the top-down game is to infiltrate enemy territory and essentially destroy all objects. The game can be played with 1 or 2 players, each controlling one helicopter.

 Reception 
In Japan, Game Machine listed Chopper I'' on their July 15, 1988 issue as being the ninth most-successful table arcade unit of the month.

Legacy
The game was re-released for the PlayStation Portable in August 2012.

References

External links

1988 video games
Arcade video games
Helicopter video games
PlayStation Network games
Vertically scrolling shooters
SNK games
Video games developed in Japan